Lumiar School is a democratic school for children from 0 to 14 years old created in 2014 by Brazilian business man Ricardo Semler with some assistance from the Gates Foundation and the Harvard Graduate School of Education. Originally three Lumiar schools were created but now there are reportedly eight, such as in the city of São Paulo, Poços de Caldas, Sto Antonio do Pinhal, Porto Alegre in Brazil; Kent and Stowford in UK.

References

External links
  (partially on the Lumiar School)

Schools in São Paulo